Laure Diana (1897–1980) was a French film actress.

Selected filmography
 Samson (1936)
 The Tender Enemy (1936)
 A Woman of No Importance (1937)
 Three Waltzes (1938)
 The Beautiful Trip (1947)

References

Bibliography 
 St. Pierre, Paul Matthew. E.A. Dupont and his Contribution to British Film: Varieté, Moulin Rouge, Piccadilly, Atlantic, Two Worlds, Cape Forlorn. Fairleigh Dickinson University Press, 2010.

External links 
 

1897 births
1980 deaths
French film actresses
Actresses from Paris
20th-century French women